The 1986 Arizona Wildcats football team represented the University of Arizona during the 1986 NCAA Division I-A football season. They were coached by Larry Smith in his seventh and final season. The Wildcats ended the season with a 9–3 record (5–3 in Pac-10) and won the Aloha Bowl against North Carolina for their first bowl win ever.

A major highlight of the season was a 34–17 upset victory over rival Arizona State, that denied ASU an unbeaten season and chance at a potential national championship. The game also was known for Arizona returning an interception for touchdown that broke the game open.

After the season, Smith was hired by Pac-10 foe USC as the head coach (see below). He would be replaced by Hawaii coach Dick Tomey, who would ultimately have a successful tenure with the Wildcats.

Before the season
Arizona finished the 1985 season with a record of 8–3–1 (5–2 in Pac-10) and tied with Georgia in the Sun Bowl. The team entered 1986 with high expectations, and had their live television ban lifted following sanctions against them from 1983. They were also eligible to be placed in the poll rankings in the season. In addition, the Wildcats began the year in contention for the Pac-10 title and Rose Bowl.

Schedule

Personnel

Rankings

Game summaries

UCLA
Undefeated and eleventh-ranked Arizona visited UCLA at the Rose Bowl. The Wildcats led 18-0 earlier in the game and seemed like they would stay unbeaten before the Bruins bounced back to grab the lead before Arizona regained it the fourth quarter. With over a minute remaining, UCLA drove into Arizona territory and scored to retake the lead for good, and Arizona suffered a tough loss to the Bruins for the second season in a row and lost for the first time in 1986.

USC
On homecoming day, the Wildcats hosted USC in a top-20 matchup. Although the Wildcats (ranked 14th) would hang tough with the Trojans (18th), their offense didn't do enough to put up more points and fell short at the end. Smith would become USC's coach after the season (see below).

Arizona State

In the regular season finale, Arizona hosted fourth-ranked and unbeaten Arizona State in the annual rivalry game. Entering the game, Arizona State had already clinched both the Pac-10 title and Rose Bowl berth. The Wildcats defense shut down the Sun Devils’ offense for most of the game, including a goal-line stand in the third quarter. In the fourth quarter, ASU, down 24–10, drove down the field and attempted to cut into Arizona's lead. Quarterback Jeff Van Raaphorst dropped back and lofted a pass to the end zone. However, Wildcat safety Chuck Cecil intercepted the pass and ran back the other way down the sideline for a 100-yard touchdown return to give Arizona a 31–10 lead that sent Arizona Stadium (and Tucson) into a frenzy. The play led to Arizona grabbing momentum and ASU would not recover from it for the rest of the game and the Wildcats went on to win by a score of 34-17 and gave the Sun Devils their first and only loss of the season and ended ASU's chances for a possible national championship. Arizona fans often declare Cecil's pick-six as the greatest moment in Wildcat football history and not just in the UA-ASU rivalry.

Stanford
Riding high on the momentum after its big victory over Arizona State, the Wildcats traveled out of the country to play Stanford in Tokyo in a special matchup. The Cardinal would narrowly get past Arizona, ending the regular season. This was the first and so far, only time in Wildcat history that the team played a game outside of the United States.

North Carolina (Aloha Bowl)

In the Aloha Bowl in Hawaii, Arizona faced North Carolina (whom, like Arizona, are best known for their prestigious men's basketball programs). The Wildcats played hard and defeated the Tar Heels to win their first-ever bowl game in program history (the Wildcats had been winless their previous bowl appearances, including a tie in the previous year). It turned out to be Smith's final game as Arizona's coach.

Awards and honors
Byron Evans, LB, Pac-10 defensive player of the year

Season notes
This was the first season in which the Wildcats won in the postseason.
Arizona Stadium used a new logo at midfield, which featured a large red “A” with the words “Bear Down” (with “Bear” on the top of the “A” and “Down” on the bottom of it). “Bear Down” is the Wildcats’ motto. The logo would be used until the end of the 1988 season.
All three of Arizona's losses were by seven points or less. The team lost by a combined 19 points and came within at least 20 of finishing with a perfect season record.
The win over Houston remains Arizona's first and only win over the Cougars to date. The two teams would not play each other again until 2017–18, with Houston winning in both years.
Arizona and Colorado would play each other again until 2011, when Colorado joined the Pac-10 (which was renamed the Pac-12).
After this season, Arizona would not defeat Oregon on the road again until 2006.
Had the Wildcats defeated UCLA and got past either USC or Stanford, they would have finished first in the Pac-10 and made it to their first Rose Bowl and Smith would have remained Arizona's coach from 1987 onwards.
Arizona's win over Arizona State featured an interception return for a touchdown that officially went 100 yards by the NCAA. Wildcat fans would often refer to the play as “The Interception”, “The Interception Return”, or “The Pick-Six”, and would be known as the greatest moment for the football program. In addition, the play would often play on the Arizona Stadium scoreboard during pregame in later years.
The Wildcats won nine games in a season for the first time since 1975 and it was the most under Smith. Arizona's win total increased each year with Smith, as he rebuilt the program during most of the early-to-mid 1980s. The team won five in 1980, six in 1981–82, seven in 1983–84, eight in 1985, and nine this season. Prior to leaving for USC, fans thought that Smith would win ten in 1987.
An Arizona player was honored as the Pac-10 defensive player of the year for the second time, as linebacker Byron Evans won the award, joining Ricky Hunley, who was honored in 1983.

After the season
At the conclusion of the season, Smith left Arizona to accept the head coaching position at USC, due to the fact that the Trojans’ football tradition lasted longer than the Wildcats and that he would be offered more money since Los Angeles is a much larger market than Tucson, and that Arizona didn't pay him as much as the coach.

To replace Smith, the Wildcats hired Hawaii coach Dick Tomey, to take over the program (coincidentally, Arizona's Aloha Bowl victory occurred on Hawaii's home field). Arizona believed that Tomey would build a chemistry with the players and to help rebuild the team after Smith's departure. Tomey would build the Wildcats to greater heights, highlighted by a dominant defense in the early-to-mid 1990s. Tomey stepped down as coach after the 2000 season.

References

Arizona
Arizona Wildcats football seasons
Aloha Bowl champion seasons
Arizona Wildcats football